Eugene Boakye Antwi (born 1970) is a Ghanaian politician and member of the Seventh Parliament of the Fourth Republic of Ghana representing the Subin Constituency in the Ashanti Region on the ticket of the New Patriotic Party. He is the former Deputy Minister for Works and Housing.

Early life and education 
He was born on 7 May 1970 in Baman, Kwabre in the Ashanti region of Ghana. He had his PGDIP from the Post Certificate Market Research. He had his Higher National Diploma from Westminster College, UK. He further had his BA in Business Administration from the University of Westminster.

Career 
He is a banker at the Barclays Bank now ABSA from 1999 to 2002. He was the Administrator of Lord Chancellors Department from 2002 to 2006. He was the Director of EUGASS Limited from 2006 to 2016.

Politics 
He is a member of the New Patriotic Party. He is the member of parliament for the Subin Constituency in the Ashanti region.

Committees 
He is a member of the Special Budget Committee and also a member of the Lands and Forestry Committee.

References 

Ghanaian MPs 2017–2021
1970 births
Living people
New Patriotic Party politicians
Ghanaian MPs 2021–2025